Standby Records was an independent record label originally from Ohio.

Lawsuits
In 2016 Davey Suicide leaked to Alternative Press that the group had entered into a lawsuit with Standby Records. This prompted label-mates As Blood Runs Black to speak out against the label as well claiming financial issues. Suicide announced a few months after the leak that the group had come to a settlement with Standby Records.

Former artists 

 A Breach On Heaven (Active, Unsigned)
 As Blood Runs Black
 Black Veil Brides (Active, now with Sumerian Records.)
 Blessed By A Burden (Active, Unsigned)
 Bruised But Not Broken (Inactive)
 Calembour 
 Castle Grayskull (Disbanded 2010)
 Casta (Disbanded 2010)
 Cinema Sleep (Disbanded 2014)
 Chin Up, Kid (Active, Unsigned)
 Come Clean
 Count Your Blessings (Disbanded 2011)
 Cvltvre (Active, Unsigned)
 Davey Suicide (Active, Unsigned)
 Demon in Me (Active, Unsigned)
 Destruction Of A Rose (Active, Unsigned)
 Dot Dot Curve :) (Active, Unsigned)
 Emarosa (Active, now with Out of Line Music.)
 Emergency 911 (Active, Unsigned)
 Fake the Attack (Disbanded 2016)
 Farewell, My Love (Active, now with CRCL Records) 
 Freshman 15 (Active, Unsigned)
 Forever in Terror (Active, now with In-Demand Records.)
 Guns For Glory (Disbanded 2009)
 Handshakes And Highfives (Active, Unsigned)
 Hang Tight
 Holiday Unheard Of (Disbanded 2010/2011)
 Hopes Die Last (Disbanded 2017)
 I Fight Fail (Active, Unsigned)
 If Not for Me (Active, now with Theoria Records.)
 In Alcatraz 1962 (Disbanded 2013)
 I, The Dreamer
 It Comes in Waves (Active, Unsigned)

 Jesse Smith & The Holy Ghost
 Just Left  (Active, Unsigned)
 Leaders And Kings
 Light the Fire
 Modern Day Escape (Active, Unsigned)
 The Nearly Deads (Active, Unsigned)
 No Bragging Rights (Active, now with Pure Noise Records.)
 Oh The Blood (Disbanded 2009)
 Offended By Everything
 NU-95 (Active, Unsigned)
 Outline In Color (Active, now with Thriller Records.)
 Picture Me Broken (Active, Unsigned)
 Pseudo Future (Active, Unsigned)
 The Relapse Symphony (Active, Unsigned)
 Return From Exile (Active, Unsigned)
 Secret Company
 Senseless Beauty (Active, Unsigned)
 Set to Reflect (Disbanded 2015)
 Settle the Sky (Disbanded 2010)
 Shot Down Stay Down (Active, Unsigned)
 Silence the Messenger (Disbanded 2016)
 Sink In (Active, Theoria Records)
 Southview (Active, Unsigned)
 Star City Meltdown (Active, Unsigned)
 Such Strange Arts (Disbanded 2016)
 Television Supervision
 Through The Ashes (Active, Unsigned)
 Tonight Is Glory (Active, Unsigned)
 Underlined (Active, Unsigned)
 Unimagined
 Vegas Masquerade (Disbanded 2011)
 Vice On Victory (Active, Unsigned)
 The Waking Life (Disbanded 2008)
 Whispers Of Wonder (Disbanded 2014)
 With A Kiss (Disbanded 2009)
 Younger Then

References

External links

American record labels